Fontainebleau–Avon station (French: Gare de Fontainebleau–Avon) is a railway station in Avon and Fontainebleau, Île-de-France, France. The station is at kilometric point (KP) 58.941 on the Paris–Marseille railway line. The station is served by Transilien (commuter) and TER (regional) services operated by SNCF. The station was once served by the TGV a few years ago. The station is served by Transilien line R (Paris-Gare de Lyon). The station was designed by the architect François-Alexis Cendrier, one of many he worked on for the railroad company Chemins de fer de Paris à Lyon et à la Méditerranée. The station once benefited from a TGV journey to the Mediterranean Sea, with a train leaving for Marseille at 07.30 on a Saturday and returning on the Sunday evening, with a journey time is 4.30 hours. However, this is no longer the case.

Train services
The following services call at Fontainebleau–Avon as of 2022:
local service (TER Bourgogne-Franche-Comté) Paris–Montereau–Sens–Laroche-Migennes
local service (Transilien R) Paris–Melun–Montereau
local service (Transilien R) Paris–Melun–Nemours–Montargis

Gallery

See also
Transilien Paris–Lyon

References

External links

 
Transilien Network Map

Railway stations in Seine-et-Marne
Fontainebleau